Bradford Louis Saar (born February 24, 1963) is a former American football linebacker who played for the Indianapolis Colts in 1987. He played college football at Ball State University.

References 

1963 births
Living people
American football linebackers
Penn State Nittany Lions football players
Ball State Cardinals football players
Indianapolis Colts players